Marshall Main Street Historic District is a national historic district located at Marshall, Madison County, North Carolina.  It encompasses 40 contributing buildings in the central business district of Marshall.  It includes notable examples of Classical Revival architecture and buildings dating the mid-19th century through 1950.  Located in the district are the separately listed Bank of French Broad designed by James J. Baldwin and Madison County Courthouse designed by Smith & Carrier.  Other notable buildings include the Rock Café Restaurant (1947), Colonel Lawrence M. Allen House (1849; 1875; 1925), M. E. Church South (1912), O.C. Rector Building (1928), and Tweed's Department Store (c. 1925).

It was listed on the National Register of Historic Places in 2007.

References

Historic districts on the National Register of Historic Places in North Carolina
Neoclassical architecture in North Carolina
Buildings and structures in Madison County, North Carolina
National Register of Historic Places in Madison County, North Carolina